Ireland entered the Eurovision Song Contest 1992 with the song "Why Me?" by Linda Martin after she won the Irish national final.

Before Eurovision

National final 
The Irish broadcaster, Radio Telefís Éireann (RTÉ), held a national final to select the Irish entry for the Eurovision Song Contest 1992, held in Malmö, Sweden. The contest was held at the Opera House in Cork on 29 March, hosted by Pat Kenny. 8 songs competed in the contest with the winner being decided through the votes of 10 regional juries.

The winner was Linda Martin, winner of the Irish national final in 1984, with the song "Why Me?", composed by two-time winner for Ireland Johnny Logan.

At Eurovision
Martin performed 17th on the night of the contest, following the United Kingdom and preceding Denmark. Martin received 155 points, winning the contest against 23 competing countries. She received three 12 points; however, the second and third placed countries, the United Kingdom and Malta respectively, received more.

The Contest was broadcast on both RTÉ 1 and RTÉ Radio 1, with Pat Kenny providing the TV coverage and Larry Gogan providing the radio coverage, respectively. Eileen Dunne once again served as the Irish spokesperson.

Voting

References

External links
Irish National Final 1992

1992
Countries in the Eurovision Song Contest 1992
Eurovision
Eurovision